James Pollock may refer to:
 James Pollock (American politician) (1810–1890), governor of the State of Pennsylvania, 1855–1858
 James Pollock (artist) (born 1943), American artist
 James Pollock (Northern Ireland politician) (1893–1982), unionist politician in Northern Ireland
 James Arthur Pollock (1865–1922), Irish-born physicist, active in Australia
 James Dalgleish Pollock (1890–1958), Scottish recipient of the Victoria Cross
 James K. Pollock (1898–1968), American political scientist
 Jim Pollock (born 1930), Canadian politician
 Jim Pollock (rugby union), Scottish rugby union player